Tássia Carcavalli (born 31 May 1992) is a Brazilian female basketball player. At the 2012 Summer Olympics, she competed for the Brazil women's national basketball team in the women's event. She is 5 ft 9 inches tall.

She was a member of the team which competed for Brazil at the 2011 Pan American Games, winning a bronze medal.

She was also a member of the Brazil women's national basketball team which competed at the 2015 Pan American Games.

References

1992 births
Living people
Brazilian women's basketball players
Olympic basketball players of Brazil
Basketball players at the 2012 Summer Olympics
Basketball players at the 2015 Pan American Games
Basketball players at the 2011 Pan American Games
Pan American Games bronze medalists for Brazil
Pan American Games medalists in basketball
Medalists at the 2011 Pan American Games
21st-century Brazilian women